The Game of Liberty is a 1916 British silent comedy crime film directed by George Loane Tucker and starring Gerald Ames, Douglas Munro and Laura Cowie. It is also known by the alternative title of Under Suspicion. It was based on the 1915 novel of the same title by E. Phillips Oppenheim.

Cast
 Gerald Ames as Hon. Paul Walmsley  
 Douglas Munro as Joseph H. Parker 
 Laura Cowie as Eva Parker  
 Bert Wynne as Inspector Cullen  
 Sydney Fairbrother as Mrs. Bundercombe 
 Hugh Croise as Bert Johnson

References

Bibliography
 Goble, Alan. The Complete Index to Literary Sources in Film. Walter de Gruyter, 1999.

External links

1916 films
1910s crime comedy films
British silent feature films
British crime comedy films
Films directed by George Loane Tucker
Films set in England
Films based on British novels
British black-and-white films
1916 comedy films
1910s English-language films
1910s British films
Silent crime comedy films